Sainik School, Jhunjhunu, established in 2012, is a military school based at Jhunjhunu, Rajasthan, India.

It is one of several Sainik Schools. The school prepares students for entry into the  National Defence Academy. The School is affiliated with CBSE.

School Campus
The School allotted 876.132 acres of land near to the village Dorasar to construct its campus. Presently the campus is under construction.

Affiliation
The institution is affiliated to the Central Board of Secondary Education (CBSE), New Delhi.

References

External links

Schools in Rajasthan
Sainik schools
Military high schools
Boys' schools in India
Educational institutions established in 2014
Education in Jhunjhunu district
Boarding schools in Rajasthan
2014 establishments in Rajasthan